Falmouth Synagogue was the primary synagogue of the Jewish community of Falmouth, Cornwall. The synagogue building still stands in Gyllyng Street overlooking the harbour, commemorated by a plaque, whilst a Jewish cemetery (next to the Congregationalist Cemetery, Ponsharden) also remains and is a scheduled monument.

History
By 1766 there were enough Jewish families in Falmouth to make possible the construction of a synagogue, and a second synagogue was completed in 1806 on Smithick Hill as the community grew. Its commanding location, with a fine view of Falmouth harbour, is said to have been so that Jewish merchants could observe their ships entering and leaving the harbour. For so small a community, it is perhaps surprising that it was able to employ a rabbi, and the earliest recorded minister of the community, known as Rabbi Saavil (died 1814), is buried at the town's Jewish cemetery. The last known rabbi was Samuel Herman, recorded in 1851. Shochtim are also recorded as present in the town until as late as 1872.

The synagogue, built in a German style, was closed in 1879 due to the dwindling numbers of the community and in 1892 the Chief Rabbi ordered its sale. The last representative of the community, Samuel Jacob, had left in 1881 and after his death, his widow deposited the Torah scrolls in the Royal Institution of Cornwall in Truro. One of the scrolls, previously held at the Royal Cornwall Museum, is now used by Kehillat Kernow (the Jewish Community of Cornwall).

Other remnants from this community include two yadim and a set of rimmonim, now in the Jewish Museum London.

References

External links
 BBC Cornwall: Cornwall's Jewish Journey

Religious buildings and structures in Cornwall
Synagogues completed in 1806
Former synagogues in England
Buildings and structures in Falmouth, Cornwall